Iron Mike Norton (born October 20, 1973) is an American blues musician who plays slide guitar. Known as "the King of Swamp Stomp", Norton developed a style of blues that combines elements of traditional hill country slide guitar, with modern elements of hip-hop and other modern urban styles of music.

Career

Norton was born in Fort Gordon, Georgia and raised in Springfield, Missouri and St. Petersburg, Florida. He started his professional career as a session bass player in the Tampa Bay area heavy metal scene but eventually moved on to work as a roadie for several country music acts including Mel McDaniel in the early 1990s.  From 1995 to 1997, Mike was the lead vocalist for the country rock act Ozark, which was nominated for Airplay International's Nashville King Eagle Award in 1997.

In 1997, Norton met Sonny Landreth and began to learn slide guitar.  Through his personal and professional friendship with Landreth, Mike developed his slide guitar technique that included many of the techniques pioneered by Sonny.

Prior to 2005, he toured and performed as Michael Shaun Norton. He has worked alongside such artists as Sonny Landreth, Willie Nelson, Lyle Lovett, Eric Sardinas, Rob Zombie, The Outlaws, Waylon Jennings, and Wynonna, among others.

Playing style
Norton is best known for his slide playing, having developed a technique pioneered by his mentor Sonny Landreth where he frets notes and plays chords behind the slide. He is also known for employing right hand finger tapping techniques in combination with his slide work. North is considered one of the foremost practitioners of Landreth's fret behind the slide techniques.

Discography

Studio albums

As Michael Shaun Norton
 Spooky & the Blue Voodoo Tribe (2000), B&M Records
 Red Rum (2002), B&M Records
 Carpe Noctum (2003), B&M Records
 Hellhound (2005), B&M Records

As Iron Mike Norton
 Sledge (2007), GFO Records
 Live Free or Die (2009), GFO Records
 Dirty South (2011), GFO Records
 Bad Monkey (2012), GFO Records
 Bloody Knuckles (2013), GFO Records
 Box Fulla Bones (2015), GFO Records
 Swamp Stomp (2017), GFO Records

References

External links
 
 
 

1973 births
Living people
Musicians from Springfield, Missouri
Slide guitarists
American male guitarists
Songwriters from Florida
Resonator guitarists
American blues singers
American blues guitarists
Guitarists from Florida
Blues rock musicians
21st-century American male singers
21st-century American singers
21st-century American guitarists
American male songwriters